The following is a list of squads for each nation competing in football at the 1938 Central American and Caribbean Games in Panama City.

Colombia
Head coach:  Alfonso Novoa

Costa Rica
Head coach:    Ricardo Saprissa

El Salvador
Head coach:  Pablo Ferre Elías

Mexico
Head coach:  Rafael Garza Gutiérrez

Panama
Head coach:  Romeo Parravicini

Venezuela
Head coach:  Vittorio Godigna

References

External links
 

1938 Central American and Caribbean Games
1938
1938